The 2008–09 FIS Cross-Country World Cup was a multi-race tournament over the season for cross-country skiers. It was the 28th official World Cup season in cross-country skiing for men and women. The season began on 22 November 2008 with 15 km freestyle races for women in Gällivare, won by Charlotte Kalla of Sweden. The World Cup is organised by the FIS who also run world cups and championships in ski jumping, snowboarding and alpine skiing amongst others.

Calendar 
Both men's and women's events tend to be held at the same resorts over a 2 or 3 day period. Listed below is a list of races which equates with the points table further down this page.

The Tour de Ski is a series of events which count towards the World Cup. This starts with the meet at Oberhof and concludes at Val di Fiemme.

Men

Women

Men's team

Women's team

World Cup points 
The table shows the number of points won in the 2008–09 Cross-Country Skiing World Cup for men and women.

A skier's best results in all distance races and sprint races counts towards the overall World Cup totals.

All distance races, included individual stages in Tour de Ski and in World Cup Final (which counts as 50% of a normal race), count towards the distance standings. All sprint races, including the sprint races during the Tour de Ski and the first race of the World Cup Final (which counts as 50% of a normal race), count towards the sprint standings.

The Nations Cup ranking is calculated by adding each country's individual competitors' scores and scores from team events. Relay events count double (see World Cup final positions), with only one team counting towards the total, while in team sprint events two teams contribute towards the total, with the usual World Cup points (100 to winning team, etc.) awarded.

Men's standings

Overall

Women's standings

Overall

Nations Cup

Achievements
First World Cup Podium
, 21, in his 2nd season – no. 3 in the WC 20 (Sprint F) in Rybinsk

Victories in this World Cup (all-time number of victories as of 2008/09 season in parentheses)

Men
 , 6 (8) first places
 , 4 (12) first places
 , 4 (4) first places
 , 3 (6) first places
 , 1 (13) first place
 , 1 (11) first place
 , 1 (11) first place
 , 1 (6) first places
 , 1 (3) first place
 , 1 (2) first place
 , 1 (2) first place
 , 1 (2) first place
 , 1 (2) first place
 , 1 (2) first place
 , 1 (1) first place
 , 1 (1) first place
 , 1 (1) first place
 , 1 (1) first place
 , 1 (1) first place

Women
 , 9 (16) first places
 , 5 (27) first places
 , 5 (7) first places
 , 2 (5) first places
 , 2 (4) first places
 , 2 (4) first places
 , 1 (5) first place
 , 1 (5) first place
 , 1 (3) first place
 , 1 (2) first place
 , 1 (1) first place
 , 1 (1) first place
 , 1 (1) first place

References

External links 
 World Cup, Tour de Ski and Final Rules 2008-2009

 
World Cup 2008-09
World Cup 2008-09
FIS Cross-Country World Cup seasons